Matt James is a British garden designer, horticulturist and university lecturer who rose to fame on the TV programme The City Gardener which was shown on the UK's Channel 4. Originally from Essex, he now resides with his wife and children in Cornwall.

James's gardening career began when he was a teenager working on a small farm. He then went on to study at various horticultural colleges and work at nurseries. He was honoured in 2000 as Londoner-of-the-Year in the field of environment and regeneration, in recognition of his work establishing a successful circuit of farmers' markets in the capital. His enthusiasm has led him to teaching, lecturing on a part-time basis in garden design at Falmouth University in Cornwall. Currently James leads the award-winning, degree level garden and landscape design delivery at the Eden Project in Cornwall.

James has also won two gold awards at the annual California Landscape Contractors' Association Awards.

The success of the City Gardener TV programme also led onto other successful TV programmes - Matt James Eco Eden is shown on UKTV and he is also the co-host of Selling Houses. James presented an episode of Great British Garden Revival that aired on BBC Two in 2014.

James has also filmed an American version of the City Gardener called Urban Outsiders for HGTV, featuring gardens in New York and Los Angeles.

James has also released five books - The latest is How to Plant A Garden for the Royal Horticultural Society, published in March 2016. This follows The Urban Gardener published in 2014, again for the Royal Horticultural Society. His other books were The City Garden Bible, released in 2005, The City Gardener in 2003 and The City Gardener: Urban Oasis in 2004.

Matt has also written for numerous publications about gardening and garden design including The Daily Telegraph, The Sunday Times, The Garden and the Garden Design Journal.

Publications 
 RHS How to Plant a Garden: Design tricks, ideas and planting schemes for year-round interest, 3 Mar 2016, Mitchell Beazley
 RHS The Urban Gardener, 7 Apr 2014, Mitchell Beazley
 The City Garden Bible, Channel 4 Books; Transworld Publishers

External links
 

English landscape and garden designers
English television presenters
Living people
Television personalities from Cornwall
People from Essex
Year of birth missing (living people)